The Autódromo de Concepción del Uruguay is a  racing circuit for motorsport competitions, located on the outskirts of the city of Concepción del Uruguay, in the Argentine Province of Entre Ríos. The circuit is one of three in the province, with the two other courses being in Paraná and Concordia, both of which are considered national category racing circuits. The circuit was formerly the longest circuit in the province until the circuit in Concordia was reconfigured, with the new length being ,  longer than the Autódromo de Concepción del Uruguay in its full layout.

History

The circuit was built in 2014 for the Turismo Carretera and TC Pista competitions, with its additional objectives being bringing regional motorsport competitions together, as well as enticing larger motorsport competitions to host a round in the province. A round has been hosted at the circuit every year since and as of 2019, a round of the Argentinian Rallycross Championship (Campeonato Argentino de Rallycross) has been hosted on a new mixed-surface layout of the circuit.

Events

 Current
 January: TC Mouras, TC Pista Mouras
 February: Turismo Pista
 April: Turismo Carretera, TC Pista
 May: Turismo Pista

 Former
 F4 Argentina Championship (2021)
 TC2000 Championship (2022)
 TC2000 Series (2015–2019, 2022)
 Top Race V6 (2015–2016, 2020–2022)
 Turismo Nacional (2015, 2018, 2021)
 TCR South America Touring Car Championship (2021)

Lap records 

The fastest official race lap records at the Autódromo de Concepción del Uruguay are listed as:

References 

Autódromo de Concepción del Uruguay
Autódromo de Concepción del Uruguay